Warren Beatty is an American filmmaker and actor.

Eight of the films he has produced have earned 53 Academy nominations, and in 1999, he was awarded the academy's highest honor, the Irving G. Thalberg Award. Beatty has been nominated for 18 Golden Globe Awards, winning six, including the Golden Globe Cecil B. DeMille Award, with which he was honored in 2007. Among his Golden Globe–nominated films are Splendor in the Grass (1961), his screen debut, and Bonnie and Clyde (1967), Shampoo (1975), Heaven Can Wait, Reds, Dick Tracy (1990), Bugsy (1991), Bulworth (1998), and Rules Don't Apply (2016), all of which he also produced.

Major associations

Academy Award

British Academy Film Awards

Golden Globe Awards

Tony Awards

Directors Guild Awards

Writers Guild Awards

References 

Lists of awards received by film director